The Thomas Ramsay Science and Humanities Fellowship was created in 1978, under a bequest from the local philanthropist Thomas Ramsay, who was interested in Australian history.
Its purpose is to foster research and writing across both the sciences and the humanities, with the intent that the work focus on some aspect of the Museum of Victoria's collections, research and activities.

Recipients and works
 Gary Presland (2001)
 Gareth Knapman (2008). Knapman contributed a chapter to Curating Empire: Museums and the British Imperial Experience based on his Fellowship funded work at the museum.
 Danielle Clode (1998). Clode told the story of Australian natural history through objects in the museum. The writer of the foreword of her book, Tom Griffiths, was another Fellowship recipient.
 Bernadette Hince.  Hince researched the variety of English used in Antarctica and produced a dictionary of words, meaning and expressions specific to the region.  The Fellowship funded research for a full year.
 Pamela Conder was awarded the Fellowship due to the intersection of art and zoology in her work.

References

1978 establishments in Australia
Awards established in 1978
Australian science and technology awards
Humanities awards
Fellowships
Foundations based in Australia